The sippy cup, training cup (American English) or beaker (British English) is a modern drinking cup designed for toddlers which prevents or reduces spills. Sippy cups, as opposed to an open cup, have a top which prevents spills, and the child drinks either through a spout or straw. Some sippy cups work by way of surface tension that prevents liquid from being spilled even when the cup is upended, and others have valves. A sippy cup is typically an intermediary between the transition between the bottle or breast to an open cup; however, some recommend skipping the sippy cup and transitioning directly to an open cup.

Invention 
The Sipster spill-proof sippy cup was invented by Richard Belanger, who licensed the design to Playtex.

Belanger, who is credited with the invention of the modern sippy cup, invented his version of the sippy cup during the 1980's. Belanger was tired of cleaning up drink spills caused by his son decided that he would solve the problem with his own hands. Richard Belanger was a mechanical engineer who had experience working with hot glue guns and thus knew how a nozzle worked. He put together a prototype made of tupperware pieces and a mouth piece; after experimenting with different mouth pieces (valves), he ended up with what we now recognize as the sippy cup. 

For a few years before Belanger licensed the design to Playtex, him and his family sold sippy cups to friends and family right from their house.

Usage 
The sippy cup is used to transition young children from the baby bottle to a drinking cup without a lid. Although this cup prevents spills, many dentists and professionals agree that prolonged use of the sippy cup can cause dental decay in children younger than 6.

Types and parts 

Modern day sippy cups and recent models differ from the original prototype by Richard Belanger. Sippy cups feature different types of spouts: hard spouts, soft spouts, straws, and spoutless/natural spout. Sippy cups also come with or without handles and some offer removable handles so that the cup can be adapted to the user. 

Hard Spouts: The spouts are made of hard plastic

Soft Spouts: This type of spouts are made of soft plastic, most commonly silicone.

Both types of spouts above require the user to tilt the cup upside down in order to drink from it.

Straws: Straws are used in some sippy cups instead of the hard or soft spouts.

Spoutless/Natural Spout: A type of spout that resembles a lid but allows the user to drink from it. This type of spout requires the user to tilt the cup to drink, when the cup is tiled upside down the "lid" seals so that the liquid is not spilled.

Prehistoric counterparts 
Initially, there was debate among researchers over if the cups were used to nurse infants or were used for the sick and elderly. In 2019, a study was conducted on three vessels found in the graves of children no older than 6 in Bavaria in the 1990s. Archaeologists typically analyze the food kept in ancient pottery by grinding up small shards and analyzing the chemical compounds of the residue in the powder, however, complete pottery is analyzed by swabbing the inside of the vessel for loose particles. The vessels used in the 2019 study were unglazed, leaving more withstanding particles behind in them. Julie Dunne, from the University of Bristol, was lead co-author of the study, the results of which were published in the journal Nature. 

Residues of animal milks were found in the vessels, not only indicating that the cups were used for children and not the infirm, but also providing the first evidence for prehistoric infants being supplemented and weaned with animal milk. Previously, it had been thought that prehistoric infants had only been fed breast milk. Scientists are unsure if the presence of animal milk as opposed to breast milk contributed to the deaths of the children in the graves. Additionally, some of the vessels were shaped like animals, which Dunne believes was simply to make children happy. Researchers further tested this theory by creating a recreation of one of the vessels, filling it with diluted apple sauce, and giving it to a 1 year old infant, who intuitively figured out how to suckle on the spout. 

The presence of these artifacts implies a shift from a hunter-gatherer lifestyle to a more sedentary lifestyle with more reliable access to milk, as well as potentially having facilitated a baby boom with the ability to wean children off of breast milk earlier, allowing women to have children more frequently.

See also
 Fuddling cup
 Noggin (cup)
 Plastic cup
 Pythagorean cup

References

Drinkware